Stanley Silvers Bergen Jr. (May 2, 1929 – April 24, 2019) was an American physician, university president, and professor. He was president of the University of Medicine and Dentistry of New Jersey from 1971 to 1998. Bergen served as senior vice president of the New York City Health and Hospitals Corporation from 1970 to 1971. The Dr. Stanley S. Bergen Building in Newark, New Jersey is named in his honor. He held multiple honorary doctorates, including a Legum Doctor from Princeton University.

Bergen died on April 24, 2019, at his home in Stonington, Maine.

References

External links
 Alumni Profile

1929 births
2019 deaths
University of Medicine and Dentistry of New Jersey faculty
People from Princeton, New Jersey
People from Stonington, Maine